Waddell is an unincorporated community in Maricopa County, Arizona, United States, northwest of the city of Phoenix. Waddell is named after Donald Ware Waddell, a native of Ohio, who was a partner in the New York City investment firm of Brandon, Gordon and Waddell.   It was this firm that organized the private financing for construction of the dam for the water reclamation project that creates Lake Pleasant.   The intended Waddell town site was laid out by Donald W. Waddell in 1935, on property he owned on the northeast corner of Waddell Road and Cotton Lane (Section 12, T3N, R2W, G&SRB&M).   Waddell moved to the area to oversee the firm's interests in the project.  He served on the board of the Maricopa Water District and invested in land through his interests in the Arizona Citrus Land Company and the Waddell Ranch Company.

In 1937, the Waddell Post Office was established inside the store on the original town site.  Later, the post office moved across the street and shared space with the cotton gin office. The current Waddell Post Office was built in 1992 and is located on Glendale Avenue and Cotton Lane, four miles south of the original site.  The town never did develop, but remained a post office and place name for the area.

The dam on the Agua Fria River that creates Lake Pleasant (once called Frog Tanks Dam then, Pleasant Dam) was renamed for Donald W. Waddell in 1963, shortly after his death, in recognition of his contributions to the Maricopa Water District.  Barry M. Goldwater spoke at the dedication ceremony.

With the expansion of the city of Surprise, use of the name Waddell to describe the location is rapidly falling into disuse.  Influence of the name can still be seen in the name of Waddell Road, an arterial street running through Surprise, as well as the New Waddell Dam at Lake Pleasant. In November 2010 the White Tank Regional Library opened.

The community contains the Wat Promkunaram Buddhist Temple. This facility was the site of a mass shooting in 1991 which left nine people dead, among them monks and temple helpers. It remains the deadliest homicide incident in Arizona history since statehood. Sixteen-year-old Alessandro Garcia and 17-year-old Jonathan Doody were charged with the crime, convicted, and sentenced. Doody was tried three times and sentenced to 281 years of prison in 2014.

See also

References

External links

Unincorporated communities in Maricopa County, Arizona
Unincorporated communities in Arizona
Populated places established in 1935
1925 establishments in Arizona